The .242 Rimless Nitro Express, also known as the .242 Vickers and initially called the .242 Manton, was a rimless bottleneck centerfire rifle cartridge developed by Kynoch for J. Manton & Co of Calcutta and introduced in 1923.

The .242 Rimless is very similar to the .243 Winchester in performance, although the cartridge is significantly longer. It fired a 100 gr projectile at 2800 fps.

See also
Nitro Express
List of rifle cartridges
6mm rifle cartridges

References

External links
 ".242 Rimless Nitro Express (Vickers)", cartridgecollector.net, retrieved 12 February 2017.

Pistol and rifle cartridges
British firearm cartridges